Brian Frederick Windley (born 1936) is a British geologist. He is Emeritus Professor of Geology at the University of Leicester.

Educated at the University of Liverpool and University of Exeter, he began his career with the Geological Survey of Greenland in 1963. Among his awards are the Bigsby Medal (1977) and the Murchison Medal (1985). According to Google Scholar he has a h-index of 104.

References

Living people
1936 births
British geologists
Academics of the University of Leicester
Alumni of the University of Liverpool
Alumni of the University of Exeter